Yukhary Leninabad is a village in the Babek District of the Nakhchivan Autonomous Republic of Azerbaijan.

References 

Populated places in Nakhchivan Autonomous Republic